Grange railway station is the terminus station of the Grange line. Situated in the western Adelaide suburb of Grange, it is 13 kilometres from Adelaide station.

History

The original station, located 13.2 kilometers from Adelaide and on the western side of Military Road, was opened in September 1882 as the terminus of the Grange railway line. Initially operated by a private company, South Australian Railways took over the line in the 1890s, and extended it to Henley Beach station via the Henley Beach railway line. On 31 August 1957, however, the line was cut back to Grange.

On 9 March 1986, the current Grange station, on the eastern side of Military Road replaced the original station on the western side. The station was relocated to prevent traffic flow along Military Road from being interrupted by the arrival of trains. The ticket office and shelter of the original station were demolished shortly after, but the unused platform remains in place.

The station passenger shelter was replaced in 2017.

On 22 November 2022, a train derailed at the station by overshooting into the buffers. Nobody on the train was injured, and services resumed on the following day with trains terminating at the east end of the platform.

Services by platform

Transport links 

|}

References

External links
 Flickr gallery

Railway stations in Adelaide
Railway stations in Australia opened in 1882
Railway stations in Australia opened in 1986